Samira Winter (born May 9, 1991) is a Brazilian singer and songwriter, best known as the vocalist of the bi-lingual indie rock band Winter.

Career

Winter was born in Curitiba, Brazil, to a Brazilian mother and an American father. She moved to Los Angeles, California, in order to get into college. Her band, Winter, named after her last name, was conceived in Boston in 2012, and they soon released their first EP, "Daydreaming", on the next year, through Lolipop Records. The 4-track EP consists of dreamy-pop, indie rock compositions written by Winter. The band's next release was 2014's "Tudo Azul", also a 4-track EP; mostly of the lyrics on this release are sang on Portuguese.

Winter's debut album, "Supreme Blue Dream", was released on March 10, 2015. Even though the album had moderated commercial success, it was critically acclaimed and spawned three singles: "Some Kind of Surprise", "Crazy" and "Pretender", all of whom had music videos released. The band embarked on a 2-year international tour to support the album, touring mostly through the US, Brazil and Argentina.

Between 2016 and 2018, while still touring to support Supreme Blue Dream, Winter released several singles with accompanying music videos, including "All the Things You Do", "Jaded" and "Dreaming". The latter has reached over 200,000 plays on Spotify, becoming the band's most successful song so far. Meanwhile, the Winter band was joined by American duo Summer Twins, formed by sisters Chelsea and Justine Brown.

Winter's second studio album, "Ethereality", was announced in February 2018, and is set to be released on April 6, 2018. "Ethereality" also marks the debut release by Everything Blue Records, Winter's official record label.

Samira's Infinite Summer
While working with the Winter band, Samira also gave birth to a solo project entitled "Samira's Infinite Summer" in mid-2015. All of the demos for the project were recorded on Samira's bedroom and posted on Samira's Infinite Summer's Bandcamp page. A studio-recorded single, "Café", was released in December 2016 and promoted mainly through the Brazilian press, since its lyrics were written in Portuguese. However, the project's Facebook and Bandcamp pages were deactivated in 2017.

Artistry

Samira is regarded for having a glittery, holographic aesthetic, which has accompanied her since her very first release as Winter. Her lyrics are known for mixing both English and Portuguese languages, which helped her to develop a following in Brazil and in the United States simultaneously. She also has a cult following in Japan.

Discography

Studio albums

Extended plays

Compilation appearances

References

1991 births
Living people
Brazilian pop singers
Feminist musicians
21st-century American singers
Musicians from Los Angeles
21st-century Brazilian women singers
21st-century Brazilian singers
American people of Brazilian descent
Brazilian people of American descent